The Navy Midshipmen men's lacrosse team represents the United States Naval Academy in National Collegiate Athletic Association (NCAA) Division I men's lacrosse. Navy currently competes as a member of the Patriot League and play their home games at Navy–Marine Corps Memorial Stadium in Annapolis, Maryland. During the 20th century, the Midshipmen secured 17 national championships, including 2 United States Intercollegiate Lacrosse Association titles and 15 Wingate Memorial Trophy awards. During the 1960s, a period of dominance for the Midshipmen, they won eight consecutive titles. The program's main rivals include Army, Maryland, and Johns Hopkins.

History
Lacrosse began at the Naval Academy in 1908 when two former Johns Hopkins players, Frank Breyer and Bill Hudgins, volunteered to help form a team. On April 4, they played their first game, against their co-founders' alma mater, which they lost, 1–6. In 1911, George Finlayson took over as head coach and a year later led Navy to its first undefeated season. The start of the First World War caused a cancellation of the 1917 season after just two games, but also marked the start of  seven season undefeated streak. From mid-season in 1916 to the final game of 1923, Navy won 45 consecutive games.

The founder of the lacrosse program at cross-city rival St. John's, William "Dinty" Moore became the Navy head coach in 1936. He remained at the helm for 23 years, during which time he helped Navy compile six national championships.

In April 1941 Navy superintendent Rear Admiral Russell Wilson refused to allow the team to play a visiting team from Harvard University because the Harvard team included a black player.  Harvard's athletic director ordered the player home and the game was played on April 4, as scheduled, which Navy won 12-0.

In 1945, the Midshipmen hosted their arch-rival Army for the traditional final game of the season. The teams fought to a stalemate, and after two overtime periods, finished the season as national co-champions.

In 1959, Willis Bilderback, a Rutgers alumnus, took over the program and led Navy to their "Decade of Dominance". During the 1960s, in large part due to a stifling defense and talented Hall of Fame attackman Jimmy Lewis, the Midshipmen compiled a 96–14-1 record (.865)  and won eight consecutive national championships, including six outright. Health problems forced Bilderback to retire after the 1972 season.

He was replaced by Dick Szlasa, who coached Navy to ten consecutive NCAA tournament appearances. Bryan Matthews took over in 1983, and Richie Meade replaced him in turn in 1995. Navy became a member of a conference for the first time in 2000 when it joined the Eastern College Athletic Conference (ECAC) Lacrosse League. In 2004, they left the ECAC to join the Patriot League. The Midshipmen have finished first outright or tied for first every year of their membership, from 2004 to 2009. Navy has also won the Patriot League tournament five of those six years.

Championships
Starting in 1926, the United States Intercollegiate Lacrosse Association (USILA) began rating college lacrosse teams and awarding gold medals to the top teams. Navy was the recipient of one of these in 1928, alongside Johns Hopkins, Maryland, and Rutgers — each of which had only one regular-season collegiate defeat. From 1936 through 1970, the USILA awarded the Wingate Memorial Trophy to the annual champion, based on regular-season records. In 1971, the NCAA began hosting an annual men's tournament to determine the national champion.  The Wingate Memorial Trophy was presented to the first two NCAA Division I champions (1971 and 1972) and was then retired. Navy has won 17 national championships:

Season results
The following is a list of Navy's results by season as an NCAA Division I program:

{| class="wikitable"

|- align="center"

†NCAA canceled 2020 collegiate activities due to the COVID-19 virus.

Head coaches 
 Frank Breyer & Bill Hudgins (1908–1910)
 George Finlayson (1911–1935)
 William "Dinty" Moore (1936–1958)
 Willis Bilderback (1959–1972)
 Dick Szlasa (1973–1982)
 Bryan Matthews (1983–1994)
 Richie Meade (1995–2011)
 Rick Sowell (2012–2019)
 Joe Amplo (2020-

MacLaughlin Award

The Lt. Donald MacLaughlin Jr. Award has been given annually since 1973 by the United States Intercollegiate Lacrosse Association (USILA) to the nation's most outstanding midfielders in NCAA Division I, Division II, and Division III. The award is named for Lt. (j.g.) Donald MacLaughlin Jr. (Class of 1963), an All-American Navy midfielder who died on a combat mission in South Vietnam in 1966.

Notable players
Jimmy Lewis

Athletic Hall of Fame
For lacrosse players in the USNA Athletic Hall of Fame, see footnote

References

External links
 

NCAA Division I men's lacrosse teams
Navy Midshipmen men's lacrosse
1908 establishments in Maryland
Lacrosse clubs established in 1908